Gran Paradiso is a 2000 German adventure film directed by Miguel Alexandre.

Cast 
 Ken Duken - Mark
 Regula Grauwiller - Lisa
 Gregor Törzs - Wolf
 Max Herbrechter - Martin
 Frank Giering - Edwin
 Erhan Emre - Rocky
 Alexander Hörbe - Harpo
 Antje Westermann - Rosi
 Gerhard Garbers - Gatterburg
 Monika Häckermann - Pflegerin

External links 

2000s adventure films
German adventure films
Mountaineering films
Films about paraplegics or quadriplegics
Films set in the Alps
2000s German films